Captain Pugwash is a fictional pirate in a series of British children's comic strips and books created by John Ryan. The character's adventures were adapted into a TV series, using cardboard cut-outs filmed in live-action (the first series was performed and broadcast live), also called Captain Pugwash, first shown on the BBC in 1957, a later colour series, first shown in 1974–75, and a traditional animation series, The Adventures of Captain Pugwash, first shown in 1998.

The eponymous hero – Captain Horatio Pugwash – sails the high seas in his ship called the Black Pig, assisted by cabin boy Tom, pirates Willy and Barnabas, and Master Mate. His mortal enemy is Cut-Throat Jake, captain of the Flying Dustman.

History
Captain Horatio Pugwash made his debut in a comic-strip format in the first issue of The Eagle in 1950, then appeared regularly as a strip in Radio Times. In 1957, the BBC commissioned a series of short cartoon films produced by Gordon Murray. Between 1957 and 1966, Ryan produced a total of 58 five-minute-long episodes for the BBC, made in black-and-white. Between 1974 and 1975, a further 30 were made in a new series made in colour. Ryan used a real-time technique of animation in which cardboard cutouts of the characters were laid on painted backgrounds and moved with levers. The characters' voices were provided by Peter Hawkins. The last series of Pugwash shorts by Ryan was produced in 1975.

Although there are many anachronisms in the series, the book The Battle of Bunkum Bay gives some useful clues as to the era in which the stories are set. In this book, the King of Great Britain strongly resembles George I and the King of France resembles Louis XIV, suggesting that this story took place in 1714–15. However, one of the few direct references to a date in the original TV series is in the episode "Pirate of the Year", where Pugwash enters the "Pirate of the Year contest 1775".

A number of spin-off books were written by Ryan, who in the 1980s drew three new Pugwash comic-strip storybooks: The Secret of the San Fiasco, The Battle of Bunkum Bay and The Quest for the Golden Handshake. A related book by John Ryan is Admiral Fatso Fitzpugwash, in which it is revealed that Pugwash had a medieval ancestor who was First Sea Lord but was terrified of water.

Episodes
The first Captain Pugwash episodes were transmitted in black-and-white between 1957 and 1966. The series was revived in colour and broadcast between 16 September 1974 and 11 July 1975. Captain Pugwash was also sold to various overseas TV stations, including Australia's ABC Television. There the show was screened during weekday afternoons in the 1970s and 1980s. The rights to Captain Pugwash were then purchased by The Britt Allcroft Company which, since 1998, has issued a number of digital and part computer-animated cartoon films based on the Pugwash character, set on the island of "Montebuffo", "somewhere in the Spanish Main". Peter Hawkins did not provide the voices, HIT Entertainment instead employing a full cast with James Saxon in the title role.

In 2005, a black-and-white episode of Captain Pugwash was repeated on BBC4 as part of the Animation Nation season.

A DVD containing "All 30 heroic high sea adventures" from the second-generation colour 1974–75 series (156 minutes running time) was given away with the Sunday Times on 20 January 2008. The 1974–5 series was made available for streaming on BritBox in the United Kingdom in July 2021.

Characters

Captain Pugwash
The pompous but likeable captain of the Black Pig. Although he boasts of being the "bravest buccaneer", he is actually quite cowardly and stupid. His greed often gets him into trouble. Nevertheless, he usually wins the day – either with the help of Tom the Cabin Boy or by sheer luck. Despite being a pirate, he is rarely seen committing any acts of piracy.

Master Mate
A somewhat dopey character, who has a tendency to use malapropisms and to mispronounce common words. He has a teddy bear in his bunk and is quite mild-mannered. It is not entirely clear why he is the mate, as he does not appear to have any authority over the rest of the crew. He was present in the first ever Pugwash story, in which he was depicted as being constantly sleepy.  Pugwash's adenoidal pronunciation of this character's name appears to be the main source of the urban legend about characters' sexually suggestive names.

Barnabas
The most aggressive of the pirates, but in reality just as harmless. He is quite rebellious and grumpy, and is perhaps marginally more intelligent than Willy, the Mate or the Captain. He was not present in the 1997 series.

Willy
A simple sailor from Wigan. He appears to be the youngest crew member (apart from Tom). He is a gentle soul, and is against using violence. He does, however, have the occasional brainwave and has been the crew's saviour (admittedly sometimes more by luck than by design). "Just you wait till we get back to Wigan – we won't half have a tale to tell!"

Tom the Cabin Boy
It might be argued that without Tom, Pugwash would have been sunk long ago. He is the most intelligent and resourceful member of the crew, the only one who can cook and the only one who can actually sail a ship. Although Pugwash would never admit it, Tom's ability to think up schemes is probably the only thing that prevents him from being a total failure as a pirate. The rest of the crew also found they were unable to operate without Tom, after he left with the captain when the crew mutinied. Tom is an expert concertina player, despite this being a 19th-century anachronism for an 18th-century pirate, and part of his repertoire is "The Trumpet Hornpipe" (the Captain Pugwash theme).

He was portrayed with a Home Counties accent in the first television adaptation, and with an Irish accent in the 1997 series.

Cut-Throat Jake
Captain Pugwash's fearsome arch-enemy, captain of the Flying Dustman (a pun on the Flying Dutchman combined with a reference to the occupation of dustman). When he is not scheming to bring about Pugwash's downfall, he is a rather more competent pirate than his enemy, and always seems to have plenty of treasure. He speaks with a stereotypical West Country accent, and is easily recognisable by his eye patch and enormous black beard.

Characters added in the later series
 Jonah
This character replaced pirate Barnabas, who was in the earlier series. His catchphrase is "No good will come of this, mark my words!" Jonah appears to be of Jamaican origin. He is the tallest of the crew so he often hits his head on the ceiling of the ship's lower deck. He is also one of the strongest of the crew as he is the Black Pig's carpenter.
 Governor of Portobello
This character lives at the top of the island in a mansion covered in vines. He talks very quietly and his head of guard, Lt. Scratchwood, usually acts as a megaphone. He is deeply in love with Donna Bonanza and attends to her every need.
 Maggie Lafayette
This pirate queen appeared in the second series when she hijacked the captain's ship to escape from the authorities.
 Swine
An Australian pirate who works for Jake. He almost always has a mug of grog in his hand. This character appeared in the original series, but never spoke, nor was he named.
 Stinka
A Mexican who works for Jake who speaks little English. He repeats everything that Jake says, annoying him greatly. Again, this character was an unnamed, unspeaking character in the earlier series.
 Lieutenant Scratchwood
The voice for the governor and the law for the town of Portobello. In charge of the guard and collecting taxes, he also spends his time chasing thieves.

Libel case regarding double entendres 
In 1991, the Pugwash cartoonist John Ryan successfully sued the Sunday Correspondent and The Guardian newspapers for inaccurately claiming that some Pugwash character names were double entendres. The claim may have originated in student rag mags from the 1970s.

Pugwashisms
Captain Pugwash is renowned for his exclamations, owing something to the style of Captain Haddock in The Adventures of Tintin:
 "Dolloping doubloons/dolphins!"
 "Coddling catfish!"
 "Lolloping landlubbers!"
 "Suffering seagulls!"
 "Staggering stalactites!"
 "Nautical nitwits!"
 "Plundering porpoises!"
 "Kipper me capstans!"
 "Tottering turtles!"
 "Dithering dogfish!"
 "Scuttling cuttlefish!"
 "Stuttering starfish!"
 "Blistering barnacles!"
 "Shuddering sharks!"

Cut-Throat Jake has occasionally been known to utter the similar exclamation, "Scupper me skull-and-crossbones!"

Theme music 
The series' signature tune was the "Trumpet Hornpipe", a folk dance that dates to at least the early nineteenth century. Some early versions of the tune refer to it as "Lascelles Hornpipe" and "Baloon Hornpipe". The composer and country of origin are unknown.

The original black-and-white episodes of Captain Pugwash used a solo rendition by the accordionist Tom Edmondson, who had learned the tune from watching Jimmy Shand's band in Northumberland as a teenager. Edmondson's version was recorded in the front room of his home in Harbottle, Northumberland, on 12 July 1954. The recording was made by the folklorist Peter Kennedy as part of the BBC's Folk Music and Dialect Recording Scheme and Edmondson was paid £1.50 (30s) for his efforts. The track was transferred to disc for the BBC Sound Library and, according to John Ryan, it was later chosen as the Captain Pugwash theme by "a genius at the BBC", whose name he could not remember.

The full recording was issued by Peter Kennedy on his Folktrax label as part of a collection entitled Scottish Accordion Music. The original tape was donated to the British Library following Kennedy's death in 2006. As of June 2020, the tape had not been digitised.

For the colour Captain Pugwash episodes, a new recording of the "Trumpet Hornpipe" was commissioned from Johnny Pearson in 1973. This version used accordion, bass and acoustic guitar, and the finished piece was retitled "Shipshape". The recording was published by KPM and was later added to the KPM Recorded Music Library which gave Pearson the composer credit.

Many online sources state that Philip Lane arranged the original version of the Captain Pugwash theme. As Lane would have been four years old in 1954, this would seem unlikely; in fact, Lane is credited on-screen with orchestrating the score for the 1998 series. Johnny Pearson was not credited on these episodes.

Captain Pugwash books
 Captain Pugwash: A Pirate Story (1957)
 Pugwash Aloft (1960)
 Pugwash and the Ghost Ship (1962)
 Pugwash in the Pacific (1963)
 Pugwash and the Sea Monster (1976)
 Captain Pugwash and the Ruby (1976)
 Captain Pugwash and the Treasure Chest (1976)
 Captain Pugwash and the New Ship (1976)
 Captain Pugwash and the Elephant (1976)
 The Captain Pugwash Cartoon Book (1977)
 Pugwash and the Buried Treasure (1980)
 Pugwash the Smuggler (1982)
 Captain Pugwash and the Fancy Dress Party (1982)
 Captain Pugwash and the Mutiny (1982)
 Pugwash and the Wreckers (1984)
 Pugwash and the Midnight Feast (1984)
 The Secret of the San Fiasco (1985)
 The Battle of Bunkum Bay (1985)
 The Quest of the Golden Handshake (1985)
 Captain Pugwash and the Pigwig (1991)
 Captain Pugwash and the Huge Reward (1991)

The books were 32 pages each, alternating two pages full colour and two pages black, blue and white, by Puffin Books.

Television episodes

1957–1966 series
Produced and directed by Gordon Murray (Series 1–8).

Series one (The Thrilling Adventures of Captain Pugwash and Stowaway Tom)
 Untitled – 8 October 1957
 Untitled – 22 October 1957 
 Untitled – 5 November 1957
 Untitled – 19 November 1957
 Untitled – 3 December 1957

These episodes were transmitted live and voiced by Noel Coleman. Only episode 2 exists in the BBC Archives as a 16mm film telerecording.

Series two (The Thrilling Adventures of Captain Pugwash and Stowaway Tom)
 Untitled – 20 April 1958
 Untitled – 18 May 1958
 Untitled – 13 July 1958  
 Untitled – 10 August 1958 
 Untitled – 7 September 1958  
 Untitled – 5 October 1958
 Untitled – 16 November 1958

The first four episodes were voiced by Howard Marion-Crawford with Peter Hawkins taking over from part five. These episodes all survive as 16mm film telerecordings apart from part six.

Series three (The Thrilling Adventures of Captain Pugwash and Stowaway Tom)
 Untitled – 22 February 1959  
 Untitled – 14 June 1959  
 Untitled – 5 July 1959  
 Untitled – 26 July 1959  
 Untitled – 23 August 1959  
 Untitled – 6 September 1959

Series 3–8 exist complete as 16mm telerecordings.

Series four (21 February 1960 – 29 May 1960)
The Firework Party
 Surprise Attack
 The Highwayman
 The Captain's Dream
 Gold Dust
 Abandon Ship
 Flying Buccaneer

Series five (7 May 1961 – 30 July 1961)
 A New Ship
 The Cuckoo Clock
 The Powder Magazine 
 Ivory Cargo
 New Sails
 On Trial
 The Map

Series six (4 February 1962 – 13 May 1962)
 Night Attack
 Ghost Ship
 The Test
 The Secret Weapon
 The Crown Jewels
 The Doctor
 Press Gang
 Man Overboard

From 3 October 1962, series 4–6 of Captain Pugwash were repeated (skipping only "The Powder Magazine" and "Ivory Cargo"). The twenty episodes ran until 29 March 1963.

Series seven (5 April 1963 – 7 July 1963)
 King of the Barbary Pirates
 Arctic Circle
 The Smugglers
 Tug-of-War
 Solid Gold
 Heads or Tails
 Mobertory Bay
 Secret Mission
 Pleasure Cruise

Series eight (1964)
 Black Pepper
 Home Grown
 Pirate Romance
 The Fortune Tellers
 A Cure for Hiccups
 High Society

Series nine (1965)
 The Secret of the Stinkas
 The Submarine
 The Haunted Reef
 The Moon of Muddipore
 The Escape
 A Hairy Affair
 Hero Willy
 Total Eclipse
 The Dragon of Pop Sings Ho
 The Vanishing Island
 Captain Moonshine
 Carnival

Series nine exists complete as 16mm telerecordings apart from "The Haunted Reef" and "The Escape".

Series ten (1966)
 The Cruise of the Flying Pig: 1
 The Cruise of the Flying Pig: 2
 The Cruise of the Flying Pig: 3
 Open Day
 The Man in the Iron Mask: 1
 The Man in the Iron Mask: 2
 The Curse of the Pugwashes 1
 The Curse of the Pugwashes 2
Series ten exists complete as 16mm telerecordings.

1974–75 series
 Down The Hatch
 Cannon Ball
 Monster Ahoy
 Mouse Amidships
 Showboat
 Flood Tide
 Pirate Picnic
 Fishmeal
 Mutiny on the Black Pig
 The Great Bank Robbery
 A Shot Across The Bows
 Wedding Bells
 Stung!
 The Golden Trail
 Diamonds on Ice
 Birthday Cake
 Witches Brew
 Six Foot Deep
 Riddle of the Rubies
 Pirate of the Year
 Easy Money
 The Plank
 A Fair Exchange
 Voyage of Discovery
 Smugglers Cove
 The Flying Buccaneer
 Island of the Dodos
 Caught in the Act
 A Tell Tale Tail
 Off With His Head

1998–2001 series
 The Stowaway Sheep
 The Portobello Plague
 The Doubledealing Duchess
 The Emperor's New Clothes
 The Boat Race
 The Dingly Dangly Crab
 Chest of Drawers
 The Vanishing Ship
 Hot Chocolate
 The Fat Cat
 The Pandemonium Parrot
 The Brush With Art
 A Hair-Raising Day
 Fiddle De Diamonds
 The Melodious Mermaid
 The Titanic Teapot
 The New Cabin Boy
 Treasure Trail
 Peppercorn Pistols
 Sticky Moments
 Muddling Monsters
 The Megamango Monkeys
 King Pugwash
 The Devil's Dog
 Perfumes of Arabia
 The Admiral's Fireworks

Cancelled film
In May 2017, a live-action film adaptation was announced, to be directed by John Hay and starring Nick Frost as Captain Pugwash and Jason Flemyng in an unknown role. Production was set to begin in 2018, with the plot following Captain Pugwash travelling to Botany Bay, where he eventually finds himself at the helm of The Black Pig on a mission to rescue Tom the Cabin Boy's father, who is marooned on a volcanic island. In March 2021, Frost revealed that the film had been cancelled because of budget issues.

Stage adaptation 
On 17 December 1973, a theatre show, Captain Pugwash, written by Ryan and John Kennett, opened at the King's Road Theatre in Chelsea, London. Directed by John Ingram and designed by John Marsh, the entertainment for children played twelve performances a week (twice daily, Monday to Saturday) until 12 January 1974. Edward Philips as Pugwash headed a cast of live actors playing characters including Tom and Cut-Throat Jake.

See also
 List of animated television series

References

External links
 Pugwash website by HIT Entertainment
 
 
 Toonhound Captain Pugwash page
 Captain Pugwash at Nostalgia Central
 Captain Pugwash at Don Markstein's Toonopedia

1950 comics debuts
BBC children's television shows
British children's animated adventure television series
British children's animated comedy television series
British comic strips
Pugwash, Captain
Pugwash, Captain
Adventure comics
Humor comics
Nautical comics
Comics adapted into television series
Comics adapted into animated series
Pugwash, Captain
Pugwash, Captain
Pugwash, Captain
Television series about pirates
ITV children's television shows
1957 British television series debuts
1966 British television series endings
1974 British television series debuts
1975 British television series endings
1998 British television series debuts
2001 British television series endings
1950s British children's television series
1960s British children's television series
1970s British children's television series
1990s British children's television series
2000s British children's television series
Pirate comics
Fictional sailors
Television shows based on children's books
British television shows featuring puppetry
Television series by Mattel Creations
English-language television shows
1970s British animated television series
1990s British animated television series
2000s British animated television series
Television series set in the 18th century
Comics set in the 18th century
Gullane Entertainment